The  was a DC electric multiple unit (EMU) train type that was operated on local services by East Japan Railway Company (JR East) in Japan from 1988 to 2017.

Variants
 107-0 series: 8 x two-car sets formerly used on Nikko Line services (until March 2013)
 107-100 series: 19 x two-car sets formerly used on Ryomo Line, Agatsuma Line, Joetsu Line, and Shinetsu Main Line services

Design
The 107 series trains were the first EMUs to be built by JR East following the splitting of the former Japanese National Railways (JNR), and reused components such as bogies and air-conditioning units from withdrawn 165 series EMUs.

107-0 series
Eight two-car sets (sets N1 to N8) were allocated to Oyama Depot for use on Nikko Line local services. The units entered service on 1 June 1988, and were originally painted in a livery designed by a Tochigi high school student, featuring large green "N" logos on a cream base. A new "retro" livery of brown and cream was introduced from March 2009, with the last train in original livery running until 17 January 2010. The 107-0 series sets were withdrawn from service on the Nikko Line on 15 March 2013.

Formation
The two-car 107-0 series trainsets, N1 to N8, were formed as follows with one motored car.

 The KuMoHa 107 car had two lozenge-type pantographs.
 The KuHa 106 car had a toilet.

Fleet history
The build details and fleet histories for the eight 107-0 series sets are as follows.

107-100 series
Nineteen 2-car sets (R1 to R19) were delivered to Takasaki Depot between November 1988 and February 1991 for use on Ryomo Line, Agatsuma Line, Joetsu Line, and Shinetsu Line local services. The livery is all-over cream with green and pink lining. Sets from R6 onwards have no door pocket windows.

Formation
The two-car 107-100 series trainsets, R1 to R19, are formed as follows with one motored car.

 The KuMoHa 107 car has one lozenge-type pantograph.
 The KuHa 106 car has a toilet.

Fleet history
The build details and fleet histories for the 19 107-100 series sets are as follows.

Withdrawal and resale

107-0 series
The Nikko Line 107-0 series fleet was withdrawn and replaced by four refurbished four-car 205 series EMUs from the start of the revised timetable on 16 March 2013.

107-100 series
The 107-100 series trainsets were gradually replaced by reformed four-car 211 series EMUs from 2016, and from the start of the 4 March 2017 timetable revision, were removed from use on the Joetsu Line (except for between Takasaki and Shin-Maebashi), Shinetsu main Line, and
Agatsuma Line, with one pair of sets remaining in use on the Ryomo Line. By 1 July 2017, eight sets remained on the books, with just two of these, R7 and R8, actually operational. The last remaining sets were withdrawn from service in late September 2017, with a few special runs in early October held to mark their withdrawal; following this, the 107 series was officially withdrawn.

Resale
Six two-car sets were scheduled to be resold to the Joshin Electric Railway in Gunma Prefecture.

12 vehicles were transferred to the Joshin Electric Railway; the first two-car train entered service on 10 March 2019.

References

External links

 JR East 107 series 

Electric multiple units of Japan
East Japan Railway Company
Train-related introductions in 1988
1500 V DC multiple units of Japan